Catarina Hurtig (born 2 March 1975) is a Swedish journalist and author, and a participant in the first season of the TV show Kändisdjungeln (2009), Sweden's version of I'm a Celebrity...Get Me Out of Here! In 2009 Catarina Hurtig started a media frenzy when she was the first person to break the news, on her now defunct blog "Ladylike", that Prince Carl Philip had split up with his former girlfriend.

She started as a royal correspondent in 1999 and has followed the royals ever since. She has been a guest at several royal weddings and traveled with Victoria, and the Crown Princess of Sweden to Uganda, Ethiopia, Lithuania, and Japan. She also participated in the King and Queen of Sweden's state visits to the King and Queen of Thailand as well as to the Sultan of Brunei. She is the author of several books on European Royalty.

Bibliography
 Uppdrag: Prinsessa, Bonnier Fakta, Stockholm, Sweden 2006.  (inb.). Libris 10017430.
 H.K.H. Victoria: ett personligt porträtt, Norstedt, Stockholm, Sweden 2010.  (inb.). Libris 11746171.
 Det kungliga året 2008, Natur & Kultur, Stockholm, Sweden 2008.  (inb.). Libris 10654093.
 Prinsessor i Skandinavien, Adelphi Audio, Stockholm, Sweden 2010.  (audiobook). Libris 11829077.
 Prinsessor, Pocketförlaget, Stockholm, Sweden 2007. . Libris 10417320.
 H.K.H. Victoria: ett personligt porträtt, Norstedt, Stockholm, Sweden 2010.  (inb.). Libris 11746171.
 Yrke: prinsesse, Gyldendal, Oslo 2007. .
 Profession: prinsesse, People's Press, Copenhagen 2007. .
 Profession: prinsesse, Den Grimme Ælling, Copenhagen 2007. (audiobook)
 Todelliset prinsessat, Otava, Helsinki, Soumi 2007. .
 Prinsessen, A.W. Bruna Uitgevers, Utrecht, Netherlands 2007. .
 Päris printsessid, Kirjastus Kunst, Tallinn, Estonia 2009. 
 Европейские принцессы, Катарина Хартиг, Амфора,(Amphora), St Petersburg, Russia 2009.

References

External links

1975 births
Living people
Swedish journalists
Royal correspondents